The Flora School, at 82744 Church St. in Flora, Oregon, is a historic Bungalow/craftsman-style former school building that is listed on the National Register of Historic Places (NRHP).  Built in 1915, it was deemed significant for association with education and the community, and for its architecture.  It is a  building that, at the time of its 1996 NRHP nomination, had been vacant since 1977 and then had a weathered condition.  It was added to the NRHP in 1997.

References 

National Register of Historic Places in Wallowa County, Oregon
School buildings completed in 1915
Buildings and structures in Wallowa County, Oregon
School buildings on the National Register of Historic Places in Oregon
1915 establishments in Oregon